Rezzo is a comune (municipality) in the Province of Imperia in the Italian region Liguria, located about  southwest of Genoa and about  northwest of Imperia.

Geography 

Rezzo borders the following municipalities: Aurigo, Borgomaro, Carpasio, Molini di Triora, Montegrosso Pian Latte, Pieve di Teco, and Pornassio.

History 
In 1928 the Fascist regime, bent on creating wider Comuni, unified Rezzo with two smaller neighbouring townships, Cenova and Lavina, thus unifying at administrative level the valley of the Giara di Rezzo.

Demographic evolution

See also 
 Giara di Rezzo

References

See also
 Parco naturale regionale delle Alpi Liguri

Cities and towns in Liguria